La Tourney is a town in Vieux Fort District in the island country of Saint Lucia. La Tourney is in the La Tourney/Cedar Heights section of Vieux Fort District, which has a population of 706. La Tourney is located on the southern coast of Saint Lucia, close to Hewanorra International Airport.

See also
List of cities in Saint Lucia
Vieux Fort District

References

Towns in Saint Lucia